Silene pendula, called the nodding catchfly or drooping catchfly, is a species of flowering plant in the genus Silene, native to Italy, Greece, and Turkey, and introduced to scattered locations in North America, South America, Africa, Europe and Asia. A number of cultivars are available. A 2020 study showed with certainty that, despite their morphological similarities, Silene cisplatensis is not synonymous with Silene pendula.

References

pendula
Garden plants of Europe
Plants described in 1753
Taxa named by Carl Linnaeus
Flora of Malta